Chicamuxen Wildlife Management Area is a state Wildlife Management Area along Chickamuxen Creek near the Potomac River in Charles County, Maryland. The area includes a variety of landforms from marshland to rolling forest. The area provides duck and white-tailed deer habitat. The area was the location of an encampment for General Joseph Hooker's troops during the American Civil War.

References

External links
 Chicamuxen Wildlife Management Area

Wildlife management areas of Maryland
Protected areas of Charles County, Maryland